Sardar-e Jangal may refer to:
 Sardar-e Jangal District
 Sardar-e Jangal Rural District